Rebecca A. Herb (born 1948) is an American mathematician, a professor emerita at the University of Maryland. Her research involves abstract algebra and Lie groups.

In 2012, Herb became one of the inaugural fellows of the American Mathematical Society.
In 2013, she was one of ten recipients of the first Service Awards of the Association for Women in Mathematics “for her service as AWM Treasurer (2004–2012), and her help during AWM’s transition from its headquarters at the University of Maryland to the management company STAT.”

Herb earned her Ph.D. in 1974 from the University of Washington under the supervision of Garth William Warner, Jr. From 2004 until 2012 (when she was succeeded by Ellen Kirkman) Herb was treasurer of the Association for Women in Mathematics.

References

1948 births
Living people
20th-century American mathematicians
21st-century American mathematicians
American women mathematicians
University of Washington alumni
University of Maryland, College Park faculty
Fellows of the American Mathematical Society
20th-century women mathematicians
21st-century women mathematicians
20th-century American women
21st-century American women